"Night Like This" is a song performed by American contemporary Christian music singer Crowder. It was released on May 15, 2020, as the fifth and final single from his third studio album, I Know a Ghost (2018). Crowder wrote the song.

"Night Like This" peaked at No. 47 on the US Hot Christian Songs chart.

Composition
"Night Like This" is a "full-on country" track, with a campfire singalong feel reminiscent of Rend Collective.

Critical reception
Joshua Andre of 365 Days of Inspiring Media gave a poor review of "Night Like This", saying the original version of the song "sadly is a misstep," as Crowder's voice does fit at all on a full-on country song, also opining that while the three renditions "are quite compelling," the songs do "get old quickly."

Commercial performance
"Night Like This" debuted at number 47 on the US Hot Christian Songs chart dated May 30, 2020.

Music videos
Crowder released audio video of "Night Like This"  showcasing the I Know a Ghost album artwork through YouTube on November 9, 2018. On May 15, 2020, Crowder published via YouTube, the visualisers of the "Night Like This" Red Dirt Drip Mix, and Country Fried Mix, as well as the audio video of the Sundown Time mix.

Track listing

Personnel
Adapted from Tidal, and AllMusic.
 Crowder — mixing , primary artist , producer , remixing 
 Joe LaPorta — mastering 
 Jacob "Biz" Morris — mixing 
 Solomon Olds — producer 
 Zach Paradis — remixing

Charts

Release history

References

External links
 

2020 singles
2018 songs
Crowder (musician) songs
Sparrow Records singles